Friends and Neighbors: Live at Prince Street is a live album by the American jazz saxophonist and composer Ornette Coleman recorded in 1970 and released on the Flying Dutchman label.

Reception

In a retrospective review for Allmusic, jazz writer Scott Yanow found the music "typically adventurous, melodic in its own way, yet still pretty futuristic, even if (compared with his other releases) the set as a whole is not all that essential". Writing in MSN Music, Robert Christgau believed it has the unintended feel of a jam session, as Coleman's "time-tested Charlie Haden-Ed Blackwell rhythm section beefed up by Dewey Redman, whose tenor is always there to add some body when Ornette picks up a trumpet or violin."

The authors of The Penguin Guide to Jazz awarded the album 3½ stars, and commented: "Friends and Neighbors... catches Ornette in particularly laid-back form, sounding relaxed even in the squalls of violin on the title track and creating blues progressions of astonishing originality on the alto tracks. Whatever its standing, it's a more than worthwhile addition to the catalogue."

Track listing
All compositions by Ornette Coleman
 "Friends and Neighbors [Vocal Version]" - 4:14 
 "Friends and Neighbors" - 2:57 
 "Long Time No See" - 10:54 
 "Let's Play" - 3:25 
 "Forgotten Songs" - 4:26 
 "Tomorrow" - 12:07 
Recorded at Prince Street in New York on February 14, 1970.

Personnel
Ornette Coleman - alto saxophone, trumpet, violin
Dewey Redman - tenor saxophone, clarinet
Charlie Haden - bass
Ed Blackwell - drums

References

1970 live albums
Ornette Coleman live albums
Flying Dutchman Records live albums
Albums produced by Bob Thiele